Taslima Memorial Academy is a high school located at Patharghata Upazila in Barguna District, Bangladesh. It is one of the top ranked high schools in Barisal Education Board and the first ranked school in Barguna District. It is a semi-public educational institution located at College Road. It was founded by ex Mayor of Patharghata, Mallik Mohammad Ayub, on January 1, 1995. The school offers grades from class I to class X. It has two shifts, morning and day. The morning shift starts at 7:00 am and the day shift starts at 10:00 am.

History
The school was founded by Mallik Mohammad Ayub on first January, 1995. The school was inaugurated with five teachers and forty six students. Then the school was a kindergarten school and the first principal was Abu Masud. The school was named Taslima Precadet and Child Care Homes after the name of Taslima Begum, wife of Mallik Mohammad Ayub. In 1998, it was upgraded to a secondary school and was renamed Taslima Memorial Academy.

See also
List of educational institutions in Barisal

References

High schools in Bangladesh
1995 establishments in Bangladesh